Zhannat Aitenova (born 1989) is a handball player for Kaysar Club and the Kazakhstani national team.

She participated at the 2011 World Women's Handball Championship in Brazil.

References

1989 births
Living people
Kazakhstani female handball players
21st-century Kazakhstani women